Fred Childress, also known as Freddie Childress (born September 17, 1966) is a former all-star offensive lineman in the Canadian Football League and the National Football League. He was nicknamed as "the Big Chill" for his 6 feet 4 inch and 345 pound size.

Early life
While born in Little Rock, Arkansas, Childress grew up in Helena, Arkansas, playing football in high school for the Central High School Cougars. Coming out of high school, Childress was highly recruited by many top football programs, finally deciding to stay home and attend the University of Arkansas, then coached by Ken Hatfield.

College
Childress played his college football at the University of Arkansas, where he was selected as a 2nd team All-American by Pro Football Weekly as a senior in 1988. There he played with other standouts such as Steve Atwater and Barry Foster. Childress was immediately a starter at offensive guard as a freshman for Arkansas in 1985, helping the team finish 10-2 and beating the Arizona State Sun Devils in the 1985 Holiday Bowl, 18-17. As a senior, Childress helped Arkansas win the 1988 Southwest Conference championship, finishing 10-2. Childress and teammate Wayne Martin were suspended for the 1989 Cotton Bowl Classic by head coach Ken Hatfield for undisclosed reasons, and Arkansas lost the Cotton Bowl to Troy Aikman and the UCLA Bruins, 17-3.

Professional career
Childress was selected in the 2nd round of the 1989 NFL Draft by the Cincinnati Bengals.  After two seasons of tryouts, he finally played one season for the New England Patriots in 1991 (scoring a touchdown) and another in 1992 for the Cleveland Browns.

Childress played his final three seasons with the Saskatchewan Roughriders. He retired from the CFL after the  season. He was inducted into the Canadian Football Hall of Fame as a player in 2020.

References 

1966 births
Living people
American football offensive linemen
Arkansas Razorbacks football players
Birmingham Barracudas players
Calgary Stampeders players
Canadian football offensive linemen
Cleveland Browns players
New England Patriots players
Players of American football from Arkansas
Sportspeople from Little Rock, Arkansas
Saskatchewan Roughriders players
Shreveport Pirates players
Canadian Football Hall of Fame inductees